Trebgast is a municipality in the district of Kulmbach in Bavaria in Germany.

Municipal divisions

Trebgast is arranged in the following boroughs:

 Feuln
 Lindau
 Trebgast
 Waizendorf

References

Kulmbach (district)